The Pines Theater is a historic movie theater located in Lufkin, Texas.  Built in 1925, it was designed by architect Shirley Simons and/or W. P. Berry in Moderne style.

It was listed on the National Register of Historic Places in 1988.  The City of Lufkin purchased the theater in 2007.  The City has undertaken extensive restoration efforts on the theater from 2009 to 2012.

See also

National Register of Historic Places listings in Angelina County, Texas

References

External links

Theatres on the National Register of Historic Places in Texas
Streamline Moderne architecture in the United States
Buildings and structures completed in 1925
Buildings and structures in Angelina County, Texas
Cinemas and movie theaters in Texas
Lufkin, Texas
National Register of Historic Places in Angelina County, Texas